The Hawthorne House, also known as the Col. J. R. Hawthorne House, is a historic plantation house in Pine Apple, Alabama, USA. The two-story wood-frame house was built in 1854 for Joseph Richard Hawthorne by Ezra Plumb.  Joseph Hawthorne was born in 1805 in North Carolina, but the family had relocated to Wilkinson County, Georgia by 1810. Hawthorne moved to Conecuh County, Alabama in the 1830s and finally settled in Pine Apple in the 1850s. He owned several large plantations in Conecuh and Wilcox counties. He died in Pine Apple in 1889. The house was sold out of the family after his death, but was brought back into the family when acquired in 1935 by Gladys Hawthorne Whitaker and her brother, Dr. Julian Hawthorne, a New York physician.  They restored the house and it remained in the family until Mrs. Whitaker's death in 1980. The house was recorded by the Historic American Buildings Survey in 1937. It was purchased after the death of Mrs. Whitaker by Dr. Edward Childs of Mobile. The house was added to the Alabama Register of Landmarks and Heritage on November 9, 1992, and to the National Register of Historic Places on March 7, 1985, with the name of Hawtorn House.

Gallery
The Hawthorne House as recorded by the Historic American Buildings Survey:

References

External links

National Register of Historic Places in Wilcox County, Alabama
Houses on the National Register of Historic Places in Alabama
Historic American Buildings Survey in Alabama
Houses completed in 1854
Properties on the Alabama Register of Landmarks and Heritage
Plantation houses in Alabama
Houses in Wilcox County, Alabama